This is a list of Swedish sweets and desserts. The cuisine of Sweden refers to food preparation originating from Sweden or having a played a great historic part in Swedish cuisine. Sweden also shares many dishes and influences with surrounding Scandinavian countries, such as Norway, Finland, and Denmark.

Characteristics

Swedish desserts typically feature pastries rolled in different spices, such as cardamom, cinnamon, or ginger, and stuffed with a variety of fillings, such as fruit jams, whipped cream, or chocolate. Many desserts are flavored with almond extract, slivered almonds, or grounded almonds, as it is an extremely popular ingredient in Swedish cooking. Fruits featured in recipes include blackcurrant, apples--specifically of the åkerö variety, cherries, lingonberries, raspberries, gooseberries, and pears.

Another strong influence on Swedish pastries is the practice of fika. Fika is a custom involving enjoying coffee, small pastries, and quiet time to recover from everyday stress. This has led to continual development in cookie recipes, especially after World War II when rations were lifted.

Swedish desserts

Gallery

See also
 Swedish cuisine
 List of desserts

References